Myrmarachne striatipes is a jumping spider that mimics an ant. Its body length is around eight millimeters.

Name
The species name is derived from Latin striatipes "striped foot".

Distribution
Myrmarachne striatipes is known from Queensland and New South Wales.

References
  (2007): The world spider catalog, version 8.0. American Museum of Natural History.

External links
Picture of M. striatipes

Salticidae
Spiders of Australia
Spiders described in 1879